Ayr County may refer to:

 Ayrshire, a historic county in Scotland
 Ayr County Hospital, Ayrshire, Scotland, closed 1991
 Shire of Ayr, now Shire of Burdekin, a county-level division in Queensland, Australia

See also
 Ayr Township (disambiguation)
 Ayrshire (disambiguation)
 Ayr (disambiguation)